Salisbury High School (founded in 1959) is a secondary public school located in Farley Grove, Salisbury North, South Australia, Australia. In 2005, it became an IB World School and it retained this status in an evaluation in 2010. In 2016, Salisbury High converted back to an Australian Curriculum school to focus on improving areas such as STEM and Arts.

In addition, it runs three Senior School pathways: University Pathway, Vocational Education and Training Pathway, and a Community Studies Pathway which lead to further studies, work, or community service.

Technology
All staff (teaching and support staff) use basic software applications with the aim of having teaching staff engaged with Web 2.0 Interactive Technologies. Staff are engaging in MOODLE editing to provide lesson material for students on the internet.

In 2007 it became an ICT and Business Focus school due to its  emphasis on learning technologies and information literacies across the school. In 2008 it was selected as one of five South Australian secondary schools to Pilot the current Digital Education Revolution (DER). DER is a Commonwealth Government initiative to have a 1:1 ratio of computers to students for every Yr 9 to Yr 12 student in Australia by the end of 2011.

Sports

House system 
There are four houses: Cairns, Florey, Mawson and Oliphant.

School sports 
Salisbury participates in male and female soccer, football, volleyball and bowling.

Power Cup 
Salisbury High offers an elective subject to Aboriginal backgrounded students to participate in. SAASTA (South Australian Aboriginal Sports Training Academy) Power Cup is a physical education subject focusing on empowering students to connect with their Aboriginal culture, community and environment. Students receive the South Australian Certificate of Education (SACE) Integrated Learning Unit for completing the program's academic component and gain valuable skills to successfully transition into further education, training and employment.

References

External links
School website

High schools in South Australia
Public schools in South Australia
Educational institutions established in 1959
1959 establishments in Australia